Manchurian may refer to:

 Manchuria, a region in Northeast Asia
 Manchurian people, a Tungusic people who originated in Manchuria (today's Northeastern China)
 Manchurian language, a Tungusic language spoken in Northeast China
 Manchurian (dish), a style of food dishes such as chicken Manchurian, vegetable Manchurian, etc. in Indian Chinese cuisine
 Manchurian, a blue aleurone malting barley variety

See also
 Manchurians (disambiguation)
 Manchuria (disambiguation)
 Manchu (disambiguation)
 The Manchurian Candidate (disambiguation)

Language and nationality disambiguation pages